= Syeda Naseem Chishti =

- Born: Syeda Naseem Fatima Chishti; 1947 (age 78–79); Allahabad, United Provinces, India
- Occupations: Litterateur, poet, novelist, lyricist and satirist
- Known for: Literature
- Awards: National Communal Harmony Award

Begum Syeda Naseem Fatima Chishti (born 1947) is an Indian writer, poet, novelist and satirist. She has published various articles in different magazines and broadcasts on All India Radio. Her articles are mostly based on National Integration Non-violence, Peace and Harmony. She received the National Communal Harmony Award from the Ministry of Home Affairs in 2002.

Her lyrics on patriotism and harmony were set to music for the Doordarshan program "Apna Yeh Chaman," which aired for two years. She has received several awards and has actively promoted communal harmony and national integration.

== Literary works ==
- Cishtī, Sayyidah Nasīm (1995). تعاقب: ناول (in Urdu). ايجوکيشنل پبلشنگ هاؤس،. ISBN 978-81-86232-23-1.
- Cishtī, Sayyidah Nasīm (1998). شام بے سحر: مجموعه كلام (in Urdu). Educational Publishing House. ISBN 978-81-86232-59-0.
- Chishti, S. & Hardayaal, D. (1999). Bat Nikalti Hai Bat Mein, Educational Publishing House, Delhi. Delhi, India.

== Awards ==
Chishti received the National Communal Harmony Award by the Government of India, in 2002 for her contributions to promoting national integration and communal amity, along with a cash prize of ₹1 lakh.
